The bigeye tuna (Thunnus obesus) is a species of true tuna of the genus Thunnus, belonging to the wider mackerel family Scombridae. In Hawaiian, it is one of two species known as ahi, the other being the yellowfin tuna. Bigeye tuna are found in the open waters of all tropical and temperate oceans, but not in the Mediterranean Sea.

Description
Bigeye tuna can grow up to 250 centimetres (98 inches) or 8 feet, in length. They are large, deep-bodied, streamlined fish with large heads and eyes. The pectoral fins are very long, reaching back beyond the start of the second dorsal fin in juveniles and the space between the first and second dorsal fin in adults. They have 13 or 14 dorsal spines.

Physiology
Bigeye tuna have a unique physiology which allows them to forage in deeper colder waters and tolerate oxygen-poor waters. Bigeye tuna are reported to tolerate ambient oxygen levels of 1.0 mL/L and routinely reach depths where ambient oxygen content is below 1.5 mL/L, largely due to the presence of blood with a high oxygen affinity. Vascular counter-current heat exchangers maintain body temperatures above ambient water temperature. These heat exchangers are engaged to conserve heat in deeper colder waters and are disengaged to allow rapid warming as the tuna ascend from cold water into warmer surface waters, providing short-latency, physiological thermoregulation. The eyes of bigeye tuna are well developed and with a large spherical lens allowing their vision to function well in low light conditions.

Life history
Conventional tagging data and counts of growth increments in otoliths (ear bones) of bigeye tuna have recorded a maximum age of 16 years. Recorded lengths at which sexual maturity is attained varies geographically with a length at which 50% of fishes sampled are mature of 135 cm in the eastern Pacific Ocean and 102–105 cm in the western Pacific Ocean. This translates to an age of maturity of 2 – 4 years. Differences in methods of studies may contribute to this variability. Spawning takes place across most months of the year in tropical regions of the Pacific Ocean, becoming seasonal at higher latitudes when sea surface temperatures are above 24 °C. In the northwestern tropical Atlantic spawning occurs in June and July, and in January and February in the Gulf of Guinea, which is the only known Atlantic nursery area.

Behavior

Vertical movement
Bigeye tuna undertake a distinct diel shift in vertical behaviour, generally descending at dawn to deeper, cooler waters and returning to shallower, warmer waters at dusk. During the day they can undertake vertical movements into waters of 300–500 m depth that can be as much as 20 °C cooler than surface waters. Individuals undertake thermoregulatory behaviour whilst at depth, periodically returning from deeper, cooler waters to shallower, warmer waters to re-warm. Across the Pacific Ocean the depths at which bigeye tuna spend the majority of their time during the day vary: in the eastern Pacific the majority of time is spent at 200–350 m; around Hawaii the majority of time is spent at 300–400 m and in the Coral Sea the majority of time is spent at 300–500 m. These suggest that bigeye tuna (or their prey) are tracking an optimum temperature (10-15 °C) which is shallower in the eastern Pacific Ocean than in the western Pacific Ocean. The diel shift in the vertical behaviour of bigeye tuna has been suggested to be associated with the diel migration of their prey. This is supported by the identification of a number of diurnally migrating species from the stomachs of bigeye tuna  and observations of close associations between bigeye tuna and the sound scattering layer both during the day and at night.

Typical vertical behaviour of bigeye tuna shifts when fish associate with seamounts, buoys and fish aggregating devices, with individuals remaining in surface waters. Association with objects has been observed to occur over periods of approximately 10–30 days. This associative behaviour of bigeye tuna (and also other species of tuna) is taken advantage of by fisheries with approximately 27% of all catches of tunas by purse seine vessels in the western and central Pacific Ocean derived from fish aggregating devices.

Migration
Results from tagging studies show that bigeye tuna are capable of traversing ocean basins, but can also show a high degree of site fidelity to some regions. One study suggested an annual migration influenced by water temperature, specifically that near the surface. Central Pacific bigeye migrate from subtropical waters in September to tropical waters in March. The fish also briefly travel outside these thermal ranges. Other data indicate similar Pacific-wide variations.

Diet
Bigeye tuna primarily feed on epipelagic and mesopelagic fish, crustaceans and cephalopods.

Commercial fishery

Globally, approximately 450,500 metric tonnes of bigeye tuna were caught by commercial vessels in 2012. Commercial fisheries for bigeye tuna are regionally managed within the Pacific Ocean by the Western and Central Pacific Fisheries Commission (WCPFC)  and the Inter-American Tropical Tuna Commission (IATTC). In the Indian Ocean catches are managed by the Indian Ocean Tuna Commission (IOTC)  and in the Atlantic Ocean by the International Commission for the Conservation of Atlantic Tunas (ICCAT). Regular stock assessments are carried out for bigeye tuna by each of the regional fisheries management organisations with bigeye tuna currently regarded as overfished in the western and central Pacific Ocean  and eastern Pacific Ocean, close to or being overfished in the Atlantic Ocean  and not overfished in the Indian Ocean. The majority of commercial catches across the Pacific Ocean is by purse seine fleets, while catches are dominated by longline fleets in the Indian and Atlantic Oceans. Various conservation measures have been introduced by the regional fisheries management organisations which apply to particular sized vessels and fleets and include measures such as spatial and temporal closures, trip duration limits, observer requirements and limits on catches

Gallery

Threats
The bigeye tuna catch rates have also declined abruptly during the past half century, mostly due to increased industrial fisheries, with the ocean warming adding further stress to the fish species.

Research indicates that increasing ocean temperatures are taking a toll on the tuna in the Indian Ocean, where rapid warming of the ocean has resulted in a reduction of marine phytoplankton.

Conservation
Most seafood sustainability guides encourage consumption of other types of tuna. In 2010, Greenpeace International added bigeye tuna to its seafood red list. "The Greenpeace International seafood red list is a list of fish that are commonly sold in supermarkets around the world, and which have a very high risk of being sourced from unsustainable fisheries."

References

External links

National Marine Fisheries Service, 'Atlantic Bigeye Tuna'
Atlantic bigeye tuna NOAA FishWatch
Pacific bigeye tuna NOAA FishWatch
ScienceDaily (Dec. 3, 2007), 'Turning A Blind Eye To Bigeye Tuna'
 
 Tony Ayling & Geoffrey Cox, Collins Guide to the Sea Fishes of New Zealand,  (William Collins Publishers Ltd., Auckland, New Zealand 1982) 
 Clover, Charles. 2004. The End of the Line: How overfishing is changing the world and what we eat. Ebury Press, London. 
Richard W. Brill1, Keith A. Bigelow, Michael K. Musyl, Kerstin A. Fritsches, Eric J. Warrant, 'BIGEYE TUNA (THUNNUS OBESUS) BEHAVIOR AND PHYSIOLOGY AND THEIR RELEVANCE TO STOCK ASSESSMENTS AND FISHERY BIOLOGY'.  ICCAT, 2005

Fish described in 1839
Commercial fish
Fish of Hawaii
Fish of Thailand
Thunnus